Dudki may refer to the following places:
Dudki, Kutno County in Łódź Voivodeship (central Poland)
Dudki, Radomsko County in Łódź Voivodeship (central Poland)
Dudki, Podlaskie Voivodeship (north-east Poland)
Dudki, Masovian Voivodeship (east-central Poland)
Dudki, Silesian Voivodeship (south Poland)
Dudki, Ełk County in Warmian-Masurian Voivodeship (north Poland)
Dudki, Olecko County in Warmian-Masurian Voivodeship (north Poland)